The West Branch Reservoir  is a reservoir in the New York City water supply system.

Put into service in 1895, West Branch is one of 12 reservoirs in the system's Croton Watershed, and second northernmost.  It receives the flow of the upstream Boyds Corner impoundment, and, when needed, of Lake Gleneida, a controlled lake in the City supply system.  Primarily, however, it receives water from the much larger Rondout Reservoir in the Catskill Mountains on the west bank of the Hudson River via the Delaware Aqueduct.  It serves as a supplementary settling basin for these waters before releasing its flow back into the aqueduct to be carried to the Kensico Reservoir in southern Westchester County.

It consists of two basins, separated by State Route 301.

It was used for this purpose during the 1965–66 and 1985 droughts, as well as during May 1989.

Water withdrawn from the West Branch ordinarily flows via the Delaware Aqueduct to the Kensico Reservoir in Westchester County for further settling. There it mixes with additional Catskill system water carried by the Catskill Aqueduct before entering tunnels that carry it to the Hillview Reservoir in Yonkers, at the City's northern boundary.  There it enters the city's direct water supply distribution system, flowing via tunnels through the boroughs of The Bronx, Queens, and Brooklyn. The water finally stops at Staten Island.

Water in excess of New York City's needs at the West Branch Reservoir goes over its spillway and into the West Branch Croton River, which is captured downstream by the Croton Falls Reservoir.

See also
List of reservoirs and dams in New York

References

External links 
 NYCDEP Water Supply Watersheds-Links to information on reservoirs by system
 

Croton Watershed
Reservoirs in New York (state)
Protected areas of Putnam County, New York
Reservoirs in Putnam County, New York